Haplochromis victoriae is a species of cichlid endemic to Lake Victoria.  This species can reach a length of  SL.

References 

victoriae
Endemic freshwater fish of Kenya
Fish of Lake Victoria
Fish described in 1956
Taxonomy articles created by Polbot